Dobrina is a settlement in the Haloze Hills in the Municipality of Žetale in eastern Slovenia. It is made up of several smaller dispersed hamlets: Dobrina, Dobrinska Gorca, Globočec, Hrastov Vrh, Laze, Male Prekože, Podpeč, Rapače, Reber, Spodnje Ravno, Strajna, Temnjak, Velike Prekože, Veliki Vrh, Zgornje Ravno, and Žale. The area traditionally belonged to the Styria region. It is now included in the Drava Statistical Region.

References

External links
Dobrina on Geopedia

Populated places in the Municipality of Žetale